Simon II, also known as Svimon or Semayun Khan (born c. early 1610s – died 1630), was a Persian-appointed king (actually, khan) of Kartli, eastern Georgia, from 1619 to 1630/1631.

Life
A son of Bagrat Khan, Simon was a Georgian convert to Islam. He was brought up Muslim in Isfahan, Persia.

On the death of his father in 1619, Simon, still a minor, was installed by Shah Abbas I as a khan of Kartli. A Georgian noble, also a convert, Giorgi Saakadze, was appointed as a vekil (regent) and vizier to him. Largely unpopular with his Christian subjects, Simon's "khanate" never stretched beyond the capital Tbilisi and the Lower Kartli province, where the districts of Somkhiti and Sabaratiano were occupied by Persian forces.

In March 1625, Saakadze sided with the opposition in Kartli and the neighbouring Kakheti. He led Georgian forces that destroyed a Persian army at the Battle of Martqopi. Simon and his Persians fled from Tbilisi to the fortress of Aghjakala in Lower Kartli: the rebels gave Kartli to king Teimuraz I of Kakheti. On July 1 of 1625, the Persians defeated the Georgians at the Battle of Marabda. A Persian general, Isa Khan, reinstated Simon in Tbilisi, but significant parts of Kartli remained under the control of Teimuraz and Saakadze. Shah Abbas utilised the rivalry among the rebel leaders to divide them.

Soon after 1626, one of the rebel nobles and a powerful mountain lord, Zurab, Duke of Aragvi defected to Simon. Zurab later made a secret alliance with the insurgents. In 1630, he murdered the sleeping khan. Zurab sent Simon's severed head to Teimuraz, who later regained authority in Kartli.

Family
Simon was married to Jahan Banu Begum, granddaughter of Shah Abbas I by his daughter Fatima Sultan Begum. They probably had one daughter Princess Izz-i-Sharif Begum, who was married off to the Safavid prince Sayyid Abdullah al-Husaini al-Marashi, son of Mirza Muhammad Shafi. Their eldest son in turn, Sayyid Mirza Muhammad Daud al-Husaini al-Marashi (Isfahan, 25 January 1655 -  1715), Mutawali of the Shrine of the Imam Reza at Mashhad, married Princess Shahr Banu Begum, the daughter of Safavid king Suleiman I.

References

External links
Svimon II (In Georgian)

1610s births
1630 deaths
Converts to Shia Islam from Eastern Orthodoxy
Former Georgian Orthodox Christians
Safavid appointed kings of Kartli
Bagrationi dynasty of the Kingdom of Kartli
17th-century murdered monarchs
Iranian people of Georgian descent
Shia Muslims from Georgia (country)
People from Isfahan
17th-century people of Safavid Iran
Murder in 1630